Bouctouche Aerodrome  is a privately owned airfield located  northeast of Bouctouche, New Brunswick, Canada.

References

External links
Page about this aerodrome on COPA's Places to Fly airport directory

Registered aerodromes in New Brunswick
Buildings and structures in Kent County, New Brunswick
Transport in Kent County, New Brunswick